Lenoir is a city in and the county seat of Caldwell County, North Carolina, United States. The population was 18,263 at the 2020 census. Lenoir is located in the foothills of the Blue Ridge Mountains. To the northeast are the Brushy Mountains, a spur of the Blue Ridge Mountains. Hibriten Mountain, located just east of the city limits, marks the western end of the Brushy Mountains range.

Lenoir is one of the principal cities in the Hickory-Lenoir-Morganton, NC Metropolitan Statistical Area.

History
Lenoir was established in 1841 and incorporated in 1851. The city was named for Revolutionary War general and early North Carolina statesman William Lenoir, who settled north of present-day Lenoir. His restored home, Fort Defiance, is a tourist attraction.

Early history
The original settlement of Lenoir was known as Tucker's Barn, after a Tucker family that settled on the north side of Lower Creek around 1765. The homestead eventually served as a voting precinct, a muster ground, a store, and a place for celebrations. When Caldwell County was formed in 1841, a commission was appointed to choose a location for the county seat. One member proposed the south side of Lower Creek (today, the Whitnel area) because of its view of the Blue Ridge Mountains. However, since most of the county's population was on the north side of Lower Creek, the Tucker's Barn site was chosen, where Lenoir is today.

National Register of Historic Places locations
In addition to Fort Defiance, the Caldwell County Courthouse, Lenoir Downtown Historic District, Lenoir Grammar School, Lenoir High School, Mary's Grove, and Edgar Allan Poe House are listed on the National Register of Historic Places.

Geography
Lenoir is southeast of the center of Caldwell County, and is bordered to the south by the towns of Hudson and Cajah's Mountain, and to the southwest by the town of Gamewell.

The city is at the intersection of U.S. Highways 64 and 321. US 64 leads east  to Statesville and southwest  to Morganton, while US 321 leads north  to Boone and southeast  to Hickory.

The city is in the valley of Lower Creek, between the Brushy Mountains to the east and the Blue Ridge Mountains to the west. Lower Creek flows southwest to the Catawba River valley.

Climate
Lenoir has a humid subtropical climate (Köppen climate classification Cfa), with cool to mild winters and warm, humid summers. Due to the city's proximity to the Blue Ridge Mountains, temperatures tend to be slightly cooler than areas to the east.

<div style="width:75%">

</div style>

Demographics

2020 census

As of the 2020 United States census, there were 18,352 people, 7,340 households, and 4,539 families residing in the city.

2000 census
As of the census of 2000, there were 16,793 people, 6,913 households, and 4,569 families residing in the city. The population density was 1,013.7 people per square mile (391.3/km2). There were 7,461 housing units at an average density of 450.4 per square mile (173.9/km2). The racial makeup of the city was 80.88% White, 14.71% African American, 0.23% Native American, 0.67% Asian, 0.11% Pacific Islander, 2.27% from other races, and 1.13% from two or more races. Hispanic or Latino of any race were 4.25% of the population.

There were 6,913 households, out of which 27.4% had children under the age of 18 living with them, 47.0% were married couples living together, 14.8% had a female householder with no husband present, and 33.9% were non-families. 29.7% of all households were made up of individuals, and 13.1% had someone living alone who was 65 years of age or older. The average household size was 2.34 and the average family size was 2.87.

In the city, the population was spread out, with 22.9% under the age of 18, 8.1% from 18 to 24, 27.5% from 25 to 44, 23.3% from 45 to 64, and 18.3% who were 65 years of age or older. The median age was 39 years. For every 100 females, there were 91.1 males. For every 100 females age 18 and over, there were 88.2 males.

The median income for a household in the city was $29,369, and the median income for a family was $37,280. Males had a median income of $26,122 versus $21,895 for females. The per capita income for the city was $16,697. About 10.4% of families and 14.3% of the population were below the poverty line, including 20.4% of those under age 18 and 12.7% of those age 65 or over.

Economy
The Broyhill Furniture company, one of the largest furniture companies in the United States and part of Heritage Home Group (KPS Capital Partners), recently closed its headquarters in Lenoir. Furniture in general has historically been one of the city's largest employers. The Bernhardt, Kincaid, and Fairfield furniture companies are based in or around Lenoir. In the 1990s, these companies began changing their business models to reflect consumer trends, and closed several of Lenoir's furniture factories. Recent consolidations of area furniture facilities (Thomasville, Taylorsville, North Wilkesboro, etc.) have netted modest gains in positions in the industry around Lenoir. The medical and education sectors are now the area's largest employers.

Google, Inc. has a server farm, or "data center", in Lenoir. There was controversy over the nature, amount, and potential benefits of economic development incentives that the City of Lenoir, Caldwell County, and the State of North Carolina gave Google in 2007 to induce the company to build the server farm. The less celebrated benefits of the investment have been construction employment and spending, a small-time server farm investment just outside downtown, Dacentec, as well as local charitable and educational endeavors by Google.

Wholesale nurseries, shipping large balled and burlap plants to landscapers in metropolitan areas, have been a strong source of employment in Lenoir over the last 75 years. Companies such as Roger Coffey and Sons Nursery have seen an increase in sales over the last three years. Valley View Nursery is a third-generation nursery carrying on the tradition of shipping high-quality trees and shrubs directly to high-end residential homes across the East Coast and upper Midwest. Local nurseries employ around two percent of the local population.

Parks and recreation

 5.3 mile Greenway system
 Mack Cook Stadium
 Mulberry Recreation Center
 T. Henry Wilson Athletic Park
 T.H. Broyhill Walking Park
 Lenoir Rotary Soccer Complex
 J.E. Broyhill Park
 Martin Luther King Center
 Zack's Fork Mountain Bike Trail

Teams
 Lenoir Youth Soccer Association / Lenoir Force (LYSA Force), a travel soccer team in Lenoir
 Caldwell County Youth Football League
 Post 29 Youth Baseball
 Carolina Express Basketball

Recreation
 The Lenior Aquatic and Fitness Center is open to the public and features an Olympic size swimming pool, indoor junior size swimming pool, water slides, racquetball courts, exercise equipment, a steam and weight room, locker rooms, covered shelters, and a walking and mountain bike training system.
 The 18-hole Lenoir Golf Club in Lenoir features 6,385 yards of golf, with a course rating of 71.3 and a slope rating of 125, on Bermuda grass. The course opened with nine holes in 1928, was redesigned by Donald Ross in 1945, and was expanded to 18 holes in 1961.

Hiking
 Nearby Hibriten Mountain has a  hiking trail, climbing  on a gated-gravel road.

Education

High schools
Hibriten
West Caldwell
South Caldwell

Middle schools
Gamewell Middle School
William Lenoir Middle School

K–8 schools
Happy Valley School
Kings Creek School
Oak Hill School

Elementary schools
Davenport A+ School
Gamewell Elementary School
Lower Creek Elementary School
Valmead Elementary School
West Lenoir Elementary School 
Whitnel Elementary School

Alternative schools
Horizons Elementary 
Gateway School

College
 Caldwell Community College and Technical Institute is the community college serving Caldwell County

Media
 WKVS, Kicks 103.3 FM, local country music radio station
 WJRI, News Talk 1340 AM, local radio station
 WKGX, AM 1080, local classic hits radio station
 W218BW, FM 91.5, translator for WETS, East Tennessee State University radio station
 News-Topic, local newspaper in Lenoir and Caldwell Counties
 The Presbyterian Layman, a publication of the Presbyterian Lay Committee independent of the denomination, is published in Lenoir.

Infrastructure

Highways
  US 321

  US 64
  NC 18
  NC 90
  NC 268

Notable people
 Claude Baker, composer
 Etta Baker, musician
 Leonard Bolick, bishop of the ELCA North Carolina Synod
 William Horton Bower, U.S. congressman from 1893–1895
 Jim Broyhill, former United States congressman for North Carolina from 1962 to 1986 and a U.S. senator from July 1986 to November 1986
 Ervin M. Bruner, Wisconsin State Assemblyman
 Claudia Church, country music artist
 Clinton A. Cilley, former mayor of Lenoir and Medal of Honor recipient during the American Civil War
 Linda Combs, former U.S. government official
 Nick Easton, NFL offensive lineman; played at Hibriten High School
 Jan Karon, New York Times-bestselling author of the Mitford Series and the Father Tim novels
 William Lenoir, Revolutionary War  General and namesake of Lenoir
 Harry Martin, former North Carolina Supreme Court justice
 Bob McCreary, former NFL player and entrepreneur
 Kary Banks Mullis, Ph.D. biochemist and Nobel laureate; inventor of the PCR
 William C. Newland, was the Lieutenant Governor of North Carolina from 1909–1913
 James Pritchett, actor who played the central character of Dr. Matt Powers on The Doctors soap opera for its entire 1963 to 1982 run
 Mark Schwartz, former professional soccer player and college coach
 Larry Smith, former NASCAR driver
 Carl Story, influential bluegrass musician 
 Hassan Whiteside, NBA player; attended The Patterson School in Lenoir
 Parker T. Williamson, minister and author
 Louis Round Wilson, University Librarian and first director of the library school at the University of North Carolina at Chapel Hill, 1901–1932
 George Younce, southern gospel vocalist, known for singing bass with The Cathedrals

Baseball players
Five Major League Baseball players were born or have been residents in Lenoir: 
 Johnny Allen, World Series Champion with the New York Yankees in 1932 and All-Star selection in 1938
 Lindsay Deal, who played for the Brooklyn Dodgers
 Charlie Cozart, who played for the Boston Braves
 Rube Walker, two-time World Series Champion with the Brooklyn/Los Angeles Dodgers
 Madison Bumgarner, three-time World Series Champion with the San Francisco Giants and 2014 World Series MVP

Accolades
Lenoir was one of the recipients of the 2008 All-America City Award.

Notes

References

External links

Cities in Caldwell County, North Carolina
County seats in North Carolina